The following is a list of Nippon Professional Baseball players who have reached the 1,000 run batted in (RBI) milestone. RBIs are usually accumulated in baseball by successfully allowing a runner on base to score as a result of making contact at-bat, although a batter is credited with an RBI if a run scores as a result of his reaching first base with the bases loaded as a result of either a base on balls (walk) or being hit by a pitch.

Sadaharu Oh holds the Nippon Professional Baseball RBI career record with 2,170.

The List 

Stats updated as of April 16, 2018.

See also

 List of Major League Baseball career runs batted in leaders
 List of top Nippon Professional Baseball home run hitters
 List of Nippon Professional Baseball career hits leaders

Notes

External links 
 Career Batting Data from Japanese Star Players, BaseballGuru.com

Nippon Professional Baseball